State Route 92 (SR 92) is an  state highway in the southeastern part of the U.S. state of Alabama. The western terminus of the highway is at an intersection with SR 167 southeast of Enterprise. The eastern terminus of the highway is at an intersection with U.S. Route 84 (US 84) in rural Houston County north of the unincorporated community of Wicksburg.

Route description

The current route of SR 92 travels through Coffee and Dale counties along a two-lane road, mainly through rural areas of Alabama's Wiregrass region and travels in a generally east–west orientation. The route shares a brief concurrency with SR 85 as it approaches Clayhatchee.

History
While the current designation of SR 92 was formed in 1962, the route has undergone significant realignment since then. Initially, the route connected Daleville in Dale County and Wicksburg in Houston County, traveling in a southeasterly direction from an intersection with SR 85 to an intersection with US 84. The route was realigned in 1995 when it essentially exchanged routes with US 84. The former route of SR 92 was improved; becoming a four-lane divided highway, and US 84 was realigned to the enhanced roadway. By rerouting US 84 through Daleville, it provided access to Fort Rucker along a U.S. highway.

Major intersections

See also

References

092
Transportation in Coffee County, Alabama
Transportation in Dale County, Alabama
Transportation in Houston County, Alabama
U.S. Route 84